Salempur is a small village situated near City Chhapra, Saran district in Bihar, India. Nearest railway station is Tekniwas and Railway Junction is Chhapra.

Villages in Saran district